Sant Llorenç de Morunys is a Benedictine monastery in Sant Llorenç de Morunys Province of Lleida, Catalonia, Spain. Built in the 11th century in Romanesque style, it was declared a Bien de Interés Cultural landmark in 1976.

Architecture and fittings

The building is an example of Romanesque-Lombard style of the 11th century. It is designed in the basilica plan with three naves. The nave is covered with a barrel vault. Under the apse was the main crypt, now in ruins. A baroque altar of Josep Pujol is dedicated to the Mare de Deu dels Colls. It covers much of the chapel and is highly decorated with a profusion of images and representations, including one of the brunette virgin. It is considered one of the most representative works of Catalan Baroque. There are murals in the central apse and the dome is painted the 19th century. The Baroque altarpiece of the Holy Spirit iby Lluís Borrassà dates to 1419. The altar, also in Baroque style, was designed by Joan Francesc Morato and was partially destroyed during the Spanish Civil War. In the Romanesque door, there are Lombard arcades. The bell tower and cloister are in Renaissance style of the 16th century . The cloister, trapezoidal in shape, has two galleries with arches supported by smooth columns.

Bibliography
 Tomo 18 (2004). La Gran Enciclopèdia en català. Barcelona, Edicions 62.  (Catalán).

External links

Benedictine monasteries in Catalonia
Romanesque architecture in Catalonia
Bien de Interés Cultural landmarks in the Province of Lleida